{{Infobox bus line
| number       = X41
| logo         = 
| image        = 
| image_width  = 
| caption      = 
| bgcolor      = Yellow
| titlecolor   = Red
| operator     = Blackburn Bus Company
| garage       = Intack Bus Depot 
| vehicle      = Volvo B7RLE Eclipse 2
|pvr           = 
| predecessors = The Lancashire WayGM Buses
| start        = Accrington
| via          = RamsbottomM66Prestwich
| end          = Manchester, Chorlton Street
| length       = 
| ibus         = 
| level        = Daily
| frequency    = Monday-Sunday: 60 <small>
Weekday Peak Mornings: 45 <small>
Weekday Peak Evenings: 50 <small>
| map          = }}Red Express, X41 is a bus service run by the Blackburn Bus Company which runs between Accrington and Manchester, serving the communities of Haslingden, Ramsbottom, Prestwich and Harpurhey, Collyhurst during peak times. The service uses the M60 and M66 motorways, connecting communities and schools like The Hollins and Haslingden High School. A point of interest in the route is the East Lancashire Railway in Ramsbottom.

 History 

Not much is known about its history before 2000. However, it was run under the Lancashire United brand by Transdev Blazefield and was given the brand The Lancashire Way in the iconic Black, Red, and Silver Blazefield livery used for their flagship route including The Witch Way and the36''' . The service ran from Blackburn to Manchester via Accrington, Haslingden and Helmshore. An express X40 service bypassed Helmshore via the motorway.

In 2012, Lancashire united gained an updated livery in yellow and blue, and as part of this they gained a fleet of  Volvo B7TL Geminis.

In 2016, following a rebrand across the Blazefield network, The X41 was rebranded as The Red Express and gained an upgraded fleet of facelifted Volvo B7TL Geminis, showcasing luxury leather seating with Free WiFi and USB power.

In 2018, following strong customer feedback and a campaign by local MPs, the service was re-routed to serve Ramsbottom whilst removing Blackburn from the route. This however is believed to be a large factor to a decine in passenger numbers and the service was almost axed in January 2020 with running costs exceeding what it was making. However a petition was generated to rescue the service, and with meetings between Hyndburn MP Sara Britcliffe, Bury North MP James Daly and directors at Blazefield, a rescue plan was agreed and the "Axe" was called off. Shortly after, the deckers were withdrawn from the route and replaced by single deck Volvo B7RLE Eclipse 2s.

Modern day 
Today, the bus service runs every hour from Accrington to Manchester via Haslingden, Ramsbottom and Prestwich. In January 2020,the new FAST route was added during peak times, where buses skipped Prestwich and instead went down Rochdale road through Harpurhey, Collyhurst and Shudehill, drastically reducing journey times.

References 

X41 Red Express